Zoltán Krenický (16 November 1925 – 22 June 1976) was a Slovak basketball player. He competed in the men's tournament at the 1948 Summer Olympics.

References

1925 births
1976 deaths
Slovak men's basketball players
Olympic basketball players of Czechoslovakia
Basketball players at the 1948 Summer Olympics
People from Michalovce District
Sportspeople from the Košice Region